Since the 1902 foundation of the National Association of Professional Baseball Leagues, commonly known as Minor League Baseball, various leagues have held interleague series in the postseason between their champions or other qualifiers.

Minor league baseball playoffs and champions
Minor
Defunct baseball competitions in the United States
Interleague minor league postseason series
Interleague minor league postseason series